Zemlianky is a village in Kremenchuk Raion, Poltava Oblast (province) of Ukraine.

Prior to 18 July 2020, Zemlianky was previously located in Hlobyne Raion.

References

Notes

Villages in Kremenchuk Raion